, or  for short, is a Japanese light novel series written by Romeo Tanaka. The novels originally featured illustrations by Tōru Yamasaki for the first six volumes, but Yamasaki was replaced by Sunaho Tobe in 2011. Shogakukan published 11 volumes from May 2007 to September 2016. Three manga adaptations have been produced. An anime adaptation produced by AIC A.S.T.A., directed by Seiji Kishi, and written by Makoto Uezu aired in Japan between July and September 2012. Sentai Filmworks has licensed the anime in North America.

Plot
Humanity Has Declined is set in a post-apocalyptic world where the human civilization has regressed and humanity keeps decreasing in numbers. The story follows an unnamed girl who acts as a mediator between humanity and the "fairies" who are small elf-like creatures attracted by sweets and happy things, but also have the habit to cause trouble to her with their powers in their endless search for amusement.

Characters

She is one of the few humans left capable of creating sweets, which causes the fairies to naturally flock to her. Having observed the slow decline of humanity, her outlook on life is grim.

The protagonist's grandfather, a researcher and firearm fanatic. Thanks to the fairies, he met with his granddaughter when he was 13 years old and a time paradox was created.

A young boy in a Hawaiian shirt who almost never speaks and serves as the protagonist's assistant.

They are mysterious beings with advanced technology that could be called magic. The fairies have permanent smiles on their faces and very literal, honest viewpoints on everything. Despite their cute appearance, they seem to have a total disregard for human safety. The presence of many fairies is supposed to increase one's fortunes, but they cause potentially fatal situations. They often request sweets from the protagonist in exchange for their assistance.

Y

An old classmate of the protagonist's whose job is to identify human artifacts. She discovers a yaoi doujinishi from our era, however, and then spends her time self-publishing yaoi doujinshi.

A humanoid robot with cat ears. She makes sound effects whenever she acknowledges something of interest. Her original name is "Pioneer".

Pion's partner, who she is searching for. His original name is "Voyager".

The protagonist's classmate from her school days, who is disturbingly affectionate.

Media

Light novels
Humanity Has Declined began as a light novel series written by Romeo Tanaka. Shogakukan published 11 volumes between May 24, 2007 and September 16, 2016 under their Gagaga Bunko imprint; nine comprise the main story, while the other two are short story collections. For the first six volumes, the novels featured illustrations by Tōru Yamasaki, but he was replaced by Sunaho Tobe in 2011. Shogakukan republished the novels with Tobe's illustrations between November 18, 2011 and March 16, 2012. The novels are published in Taiwan by Sharp Point Press.

Volume list

Manga
One chapter of a manga adaptation, illustrated by Rei Neyuki, was published in the March 2010 issue of Shogakukan's Monthly Ikki magazine, published on January 25, 2010, however, the manga went on an indefinite hiatus and was ultimately cancelled. Another manga, illustrated by Takuya Mitomi and titled , was serialized between the January 2012 issue of Monthly Ikki, published on November 25, 2011, and the July 2012 issue, released on May 25, 2012. A single tankōbon volume for Nonbirishita Hōkoku was released on July 30, 2012. 

Mitomi also illustrated the four-panel comic strip manga , which began was serialized from the August 2012 issue of Monthly Ikki on June 25, and finished in the October issue of the same year, released on August 25. A manga illustrated by Terae Kichijō and titled  was serialized between January 27, 2012 and January 26, 2013 in Media Factory's Monthly Comic Alive. Three compiled volumes have been released.

Anime
An anime television series adaptation produced by AIC A.S.T.A. and directed by Seiji Kishi aired in Japan between July 2 and September 17, 2012; it was also simulcast by Crunchyroll. The screenplay was written by Makoto Uezu, and the chief animation director Kyūta Sakai based the character design used in the anime on Sunaho Tobe's original concepts. Six bonus episodes were included on the Blu-ray Disc and DVD releases. Sentai Filmworks has licensed the series for subtitled BD/DVD release in North America in December 2013.

Episode list

Bonus episodes

References

External links
  

2007 Japanese novels
2010 manga
2012 anime television series debuts
2012 manga
Anime International Company
Anime and manga based on light novels
Comedy anime and manga
Fantasy anime and manga
Gagaga Bunko
Light novels
Media Factory manga
Post-apocalyptic anime and manga
Seinen manga
Sentai Filmworks
Sharp Point Press titles
Shogakukan franchises
Shogakukan manga
Television shows written by Makoto Uezu
Yonkoma